Sleek Spur is a tapered, ice-covered coastal spur at the east end of Kelly Plateau, Churchill Mountains. The spur is 8 nautical miles (15 km) southwest of Cape Parr where the confluent Nursery, Jorda, and Starshot Glaciers enter Ross Ice Shelf. Named descriptively by Advisory Committee on Antarctic Names (US-ACAN).

Ridges of Antarctica
Shackleton Coast

References